Azersky is an Earth observation satellite with a high-resolution of 1.5 m. It is Azerbaijan's first Earth observation satellite. It was launched into orbit in June 2014.

The satellite was originally named SPOT 7 and developed by Airbus Defence and Space as a part of their SPOT series. SPOT 7 was successfully was handed over to Azercosmos on December 2, 2014, and renamed as Azersky

Details

The satellite has a predicted lifespan 12 years.

Azersky satellite is capable of producing images of an area of 6 million km2 within one day. This implies that every single point of the Earth can be observed in high-resolution by Azersky satellite every day.

The wide application areas of Azersky satellite include defense, security, emergency situations, exploration of natural resources, maritime, environmental protection, urbanization, mapping, agriculture, tourism and others.

It has a resolution of 1.5 m for Panchromatic and 6 m for Multispectral.
It has 1 Panchromatic and 4 Multispectral bands (green, blue, red, near-infrared).
The image scene has a minimum 60X60 km and a maximum 60X600 km.
It orbits at an altitude of 694.9 km.
The revisit is 2 days (45°).
It is at an inclination of 98.2° (Sun-synchronous).

Launch and operation 
The agreement between Azerbaijan and France was signed at  the 20th Anniversary Azerbaijan International Telecommunications and Information Technologies Exhibition and Conference, Bakutel 2014 with the participation of President of the Republic of Azerbaijan Ilham Aliyev. By obtaining the first symbolic image from Azersky satellite, the President launched the commercial activity of the satellite. According to the agreement signed between the two parties, Azersky belonging to Azercosmos and SPOT 6 belonging to Airbus Defence and Space will be used in the form of satellite collection.

See also 

 Azerspace-1, Azerbaijan's first satellite (a telecommunications satellite)
Azerspace-2, Azerbaijan's third satellite (a telecommunication satellite)
Azercosmos, first and only satellite operator in South Caucasus region that operates Azerspace-1, Azerspace-2, and Azersky

References 

Earth imaging satellites
Satellites of Azerbaijan